St. Andrews International School Green Valley is an international school for children aged 2 to 18 years old in Rayong, Thailand. Green Valley is one of four schools in Thailand under the schools group Cognita, along with St. Andrews International School, Sukhumvit, St. Andrews International School, Dusit, and St. Andrews International School, Sathorn.

Curriculum 

St. Andrews Green Valley's Secondary School follows the English National Curriculum. For Upper Secondary School, the school offers the International General Certificate of Secondary Education (IGCSE), and in the final two years of schooling, offers the International Baccalaureate Diploma Programme (IBDP).

English Language 
Green Valley teaches in the English curriculum, and provides an English as an Additional Language (EAL) program for students whose English is not their first language. The program aims to successfully develop students' English proficiency to ensure students are able to perform in the mainstream classroom without EAL support.

Dutch Stream 
St. Andrews International School Green Valley is the only school on the Eastern Seaboard to offer a Dutch Stream to its students. The program provides two to three hours of instruction in a dedicated class space for students whose mother tongue is Dutch, including language lessons from Reception up through Secondary School.

Accreditation 
Green Valley is the only school on the Eastern Seaboard to be awarded 1st tier level accreditation by the Education Development Trust, making it a Gold Level International School. Gold level accreditation indicates that the school has achieved an 'Outstanding' mark in all assessment criteria, some of which include; students' personal development, consistent high standards of academic performance, leadership quality throughout management positions, and rigor and quality of teaching.

Creativity Action Service (CAS) 

As part of the IB curriculum, the CAS program requires students to pursue non-academic interests. Students are encouraged to participate in a variety of activities, including theatre productions, sports, and community service organizations.

Language 

Beginning at Year 5, all students are taught Arab and Mandarin twice a week. For Thai students, learning Thai is mandatory and is taught by dedicated Thai instructors. Additionally, the Dutch Stream is available to Dutch students, and EAL support is available to students from Nursery onwards.

University preparation

University Counselling Program 
Green Valley employs a structured program of counselling, by utilizing parent forums and information sessions to provide an outline students can use to apply for higher level educational institutions around the world.

Results

IB Examinations 
Students at Green Valley achieved an average score of 38.6 out of 45 points on the May 2016 IB DP Examinations, compared to the world average of 30.07 points. Students at the school achieved a 100% pass rate in comparison to the Africa, Europe, and Middle East (AEM) region which achieved a passing rate of 88%. One student at Green Valley achieved a perfect score on the examinations, one of 146 students worldwide.

References 

International schools in Thailand
Rayong province